Louis Siciliano (born in Naples, Italy - March 19, 1975) is a Jazz and World-Music composer, piano and synth performer, sound engineer and music producer.

Career 
Siciliano produced, composed, orchestrated, conducted and mixed soundtracks for feature film productions, TV commercials, TV movies, theater shows, musicals and opera. His music production as recording artist encompasses styles including modern jazz, electronic music, contemporary symphonic music, opera, post rock, traditional Latin music, Celtic and classical Indian music.

On 12 May 2013, he started a new artistic life with the name ::ALUEI::.

Awards 
 Nastro d'Argento 2006 for Best Score The Fever, awarded to the composers pool (Negramaro, Roy Paci, Fabio Barovero, Simone Fabbroni, Louis Siciliano)
 Award for "Best original score" at "Tropea Film Festival" 2008 
 Award "Federazione italiana dei cinema d'essai" (FICE) Mantova, 2010
 Award as Composer of the Year during "Close encounters between music and cinema" at Cinecittà Space, Venice, 2010 (collateral award during the 67th Venice International Film Festival)
 "Fontana d'argento 2012" for the cultural commitment on social life
 "Campania Award 2019" for the international activity as music composer and producer

Selected filmography

 The Fever (La febbre) (2005)
 Il rabdomante (2006)
 I, the Other (Io, l'altro) (2007)
 Family Game (2007)
 Principessa (2008)
 I mostri oggi (2009)
 My Land (2009)
 Due vite per caso (2010)
 5 (Cinque) (2010)
 Happy Family (2010)
 20 Cigarettes (20 sigarette) (2010)
 African Women (2011)
 Circeo, terra di Oscar (2011)
 Il Mundial dimenticato (2011)
 Ti stimo fratello (2012)
 Gypsy, A Man (2012)
 Io è morto (2013)
 A Napoli non piove mai (2015)
 My Italy (2016)
 Il camionista (2016)

References

External links 
 

Sicilano, Louis
Living people
Italian film score composers
Italian male film score composers
1975 births
Nastro d'Argento winners